Phleogena is a fungal genus in the Phleogenaceae family. The genus is monotypic, containing the single species Phleogena faginea and is found mostly widespread in northern temperate areas, but is occasionally found in southern areas.

References

External links

Atractiellales
Monotypic Basidiomycota genera
Fungi described in 1818